Two Happy Hearts is a 1932 Italian "white-telephones" comedy film directed by Baldassarre Negroni and starring Vittorio De Sica. It is known for its modernist set designs.

Summary
A U.S. car representative's (Melnati) wife (Aylmer) stalking on an American car mogul (De Sica) prior to supper at an important meeting.

Cast
 Rina Franchetti as Anna Rosi
 Mimì Aylmer as Clara Fabbri
 Vittorio De Sica as Mister Brown
 Umberto Melnati as Ing. Carlo Fabbri
 Loli Pilotto as La cameriera
 Giorgio Bianchi as Un amico di Fabbri
 Umberto Cocchi
 Gino Viotti

Other film versions
 A Bit of Love (March 1932, Germany, directed by Max Neufeld)
 Monsieur, Madame and Bibi (March 1932, France, directed by Max Neufeld and Jean Boyer)
 Yes, Mr. Brown (January 1933, United Kingdom, directed by Herbert Wilcox)

References

External links

Cinema Clock

1932 films
1932 comedy films
Italian comedy films
1930s Italian-language films
Italian black-and-white films
Films directed by Baldassarre Negroni
Italian remakes of foreign films
Remakes of German films
Italian multilingual films
1932 multilingual films